The discography of American rapper and singer Trippie Redd consists of five studio albums, six mixtapes, eight extended plays and 31 singles (including 15 as a featured artist).

Trippie Redd's first release was the EP Awakening My InnerBeast, released on August 25, 2016. He released several more EPs throughout 2016 and early 2017 before he issued his first mixtape, A Love Letter to You, on May 21, 2017, which became his first release to chart on a major chart, peaking on the US Billboard 200 at number 69. He subsequently issued the singles "Love Scars" and "Poles 1469" from the mixtape, both of which appeared on the Bubbling Under Hot 100 chart. Trippie Redd followed the mixtape with its sequel, A Love Letter to You 2, which peaked at number 34 on the Billboard 200 in October 2017.

Later in 2017, "Dark Knight Dummo", featuring fellow American rapper and singer Travis Scott, became Trippie Redd's first song to chart on the US Billboard Hot 100, peaking at number 72. The song was the lead single from his debut album Life's a Trip, which was released on August 10, 2018. The album appeared in the top 20 of various charts around the world, including the UK and Australia. Trippie Redd later issued the single "Taking a Walk", which appeared on the Billboard Hot 100 at number 46. Also in 2018, he issued the single "Topanga" from his third mixtape A Love Letter to You 3. The mixtape became his highest entry on the Billboard 200, debuting at number three, while "Topanga" moved to number 3 on the Billboard Hot 100 in the same week.

Albums

Studio albums

Deluxe albums

Mixtapes

Extended plays

Singles

As lead artist

As featured artist

Other charted and certified songs

Guest appearances

Notes

References

Hip hop discographies
Discographies of American artists